Julia Zhenglei Liuson (born 1970) is a Chinese-born American technology executive. She is the President of the Developer Division at Microsoft and GitHub.

Liuson oversees business and software development for Visual Studio and the .NET Framework, including Visual Studio Code, all programming languages, user interfaces, team development/testing tools, and platform adoption tools. In an interview with eWEEK, Liuson said Microsoft is working to help all developers, of all platforms and languages, be successful with tools which enable innovative scenarios.

Biography
Julia Zhenglei Liuson was born in Shanghai, China in 1970.

In 1991, Liuson received a bachelor's degree in Electrical and Computer Engineering from University of Washington. She joined Microsoft immediately after graduation. Her initial role was as a developer first on the Access team, and later on Visual InterDev, the precursor to Visual Studio.

Liuson has held a variety of technical and management positions at Microsoft. She served as development manager, and later as Partner Product Unit Manager for Visual Basic. She was then named General Manager of Visual Studio Business Applications, where she was responsible for enabling developers to easily build business applications on Microsoft server and service platforms.

Liuson served as General Manager for Server and Tools business from Microsoft Shanghai office in China for two years while running engineering teams on both sides of the Pacific Ocean.

Liuson presented keynote speeches and guest speakers in some key business and technology events including Connect() 2015, China Business Challenge 2014, and Technet 2013 for China.

Liuson lives in Kirkland, a suburb of the Seattle area near the Microsoft campus in Redmond. She and her husband have a son.

See also
Microsoft
Visual Studio
Visual Studio Code

References

External links
Visual Studio
Visual Studio Code

1970 births
Living people
Microsoft employees
University of Washington College of Engineering alumni
People from Kirkland, Washington
American women business executives
American people of Chinese descent
American technology executives
21st-century American women